The 1985 Arkansas Razorbacks football team represented the University of Arkansas during the 1985 NCAA Division I-A football season. Arkansas was the eighth-best team in the nation in rushing yards per game, with 265.6. On the defensive end, the Hogs gave up only 11.7 points per game, the 6th best mark in college football.

Razorback punt returner B.J. Edmonds finished ninth in college football with 11.6 yards per return.

Schedule

References

Arkansas
Arkansas Razorbacks football seasons
Holiday Bowl champion seasons
Arkansas Razorbacks football